Peter Charles "Pete" Magadini (born January 25, 1942) is an American drummer, percussionist, educator and author. He is known for his body of work (instructional books and videos) concerning the comprehension and execution of musical polyrhythms, especially the books The Musician's Guide to Polyrhythms and Polyrhythms for the Drumset. Magadini has recorded and performed with George Duke, Diana Ross, Bobbie Gentry, Al Jarreau, Buddy DeFranco, John Handy and Mose Allison.

Biography 

Magadini was born in Great Barrington, Massachusetts to Charles and Ruth Magadini. At the age of six, the family moved to Palm Springs, California, where he played in the elementary school band. Magadini's professional career began recording singles for Lee Hazlewood and Lester Sill while attending high school in Phoenix, Arizona. In Phoenix he studied with his first and most influential teacher Donald Bothwell and was heavily influenced by the playing of Max Roach.

In 1960 Magadini studied drum set with Roy Burns at the Henry Adler Drum School in New York City. He then enrolled at the San Francisco Conservatory of Music where he studied timpani with New York Philharmonic timpanist Roland Kohloff, graduating with a Bachelor of Music degree in 1965. During his time in San Francisco he formed a trio with keyboardist George Duke, also a student at the Conservatory, and performed with the Oakland Symphony Orchestra. In 1973 he graduated from the University of Toronto with Master of Music in Percussion and Performance – "w.distinction"

In 1968, while teaching at his alma mater, Magadini was awarded a fellowship to perform with The Berkshire Music Festival Orchestra at Tanglewood. The next year he moved to Los Angeles where he taught drums at the Hollywood Professional Drum Shop and played with the Don Menza quartet. Magadini toured with Bobbie Gentry through 1969 before joining Diana Ross' first band as a solo artist. After touring with Ross from 1970 to 1971, he attended the University of Toronto, receiving a Master of Music degree in 1973.

In 1976 he produced Polyrhthym, for IBis Records, featuring himself, George Duke, Don Menza and Dave Young. His second album, Bones Blues, with Dave Young, Don Menza and Wray Downs, received a Juno Award nomination for Best Jazz Album of the Year in 1979. Magadini has also performed extensively with and produced recordings for blues-jazz vocalist Mose Allison.

From 1988 to 1997, he taught at McGill University and Concordia University in Montreal and at the Brubeck Institute of the University of the Pacific from 2003 to 2007. He also maintains a private teaching practice in the California Bay Area.

Polyrhythms 

Magadini is widely known for his interest and expertise in polyrhythms as applied in western music and drum set. Originally inspired by his studies with tabla player Mahapurush Misra in 1966, he has published two major works on the subject: Polyrhythms for the Drumset and Polyrhythms: The Musicians Guide, (first published in two volumes in 1967) which Modern Drummer magazine ranked sixth in their survey of "The 25 Best Drum Books." In 2012 he published The Official 26 Polyrhythm Rudiments.

Discography

Videos 
2006 – Jazz Drums Hal Leonard Corporation|Hal Leonard

Books

References

External links 
 Pete Magadini Official Website
 
 Interview with Peter Magadini on the Jake Feinberg Show
 Paiste Artist: Peter Magadini
 Yamaha Drums, Pete Magadini
 Vic Firth Artist: Peter Magadini
 Applegate Music Review, Peter Magadini, Bones Blues
 Pete Magadini YouTube channel
http://www.youtube.com/watch?v=GnC9iihhvGc (Drum Solo) Cherokee
 Pete Magadini – Hal Leonard Publishing

1942 births
Living people
20th-century American drummers
20th-century American male musicians
20th-century Canadian drummers
American jazz drummers
American male drummers
American male jazz musicians
Canadian jazz drummers
Canadian male drummers
Hard bop drummers
Jazz musicians from Massachusetts
Sackville Records artists